Peate is a surname. Notable people with the surname include:

 Enid Peate (1883–1954), English artist
 Iorwerth Peate (1901–1982), Welsh poet and scholar
 Rod Peate, American poker player
 Ted Peate (1855–1900), English cricketer

See also
 Peat (surname)